Kompia may refer to:

Kompyang or kompia, a Chinese bread product
Kompia (subgenus), a subgenus of the mosquito genus Aedes